The Puerto Rico Symphony Orchestra (PRSO) (Orquesta Sinfónica de Puerto Rico in Spanish) a musical ensemble sponsored by the Government of Puerto Rico. It has 80 regular musicians from around the world performing a 52-week season which includes symphonic concerts, operas, ballets, pops, and other activities.

History
The history of the PRSO dates back to 1958 when famed cellist Don Pablo Casals visited the island to see his family and to discover the land where his mother was born. Soon after, he would dedicate most of his work to foster classical music in Puerto Rico. In 1957, he organized the first annual Casals Festival, where he invited classical musicians to perform several concerts to Puerto Ricans and tourists alike. It was during this multi-week festival that state legislator Ernesto Ramos Antonini presented a bill which would create the Puerto Rico Symphony Orchestra, receiving much praise and support from both the public and other state legislators. After the law was signed by then Governor of Puerto Rico Luis Muñoz Marín, the task of organizing the orchestra was given to the same group which organized the Casals Festival. The first live concert was performed on November 6, 1958 in Mayagüez, hometown of Don Pablo Casals’s mother.

The PRSO has hosted various artists, including Plácido Domingo, Luciano Pavarotti, Justino Díaz, Kiri Te Kanawa, and Alicia de Larrocha, among others, and has performed in various Central and South American countries as well as in the United States. In addition to its 48-week regular season, the PRSO also organizes several concerts and activities for the purpose of fulfilling Don Casals’s dream of fostering classical music in Puerto Rico. These activities include: Conoce tu Orquesta (“Know Your Orchestra”), La Sinfónica en tu Pueblo (“The Orchestra In Your Town”), La Sinfónica en las Universidades (“The Orchestra in Universities”), and La Sinfónica en los Residenciales (“The Orchestra In The Projects”; i.e. public housing), as well as performing in the annual Casals Festival.

The PRSO is currently managed by the Musical Arts Corporation of the government of Puerto Rico, who also organizes the annual Casals Festival. The PRSO regularly performs at the Luis A. Ferré Performing Arts Center.

In 2017, the orchestra was featured on "Yo Contra Ti" by Puerto Rican rapper Daddy Yankee, recorded for a breast cancer campaign in partnership with foundations Susan G. Komen Puerto Rico and J. Walter Thompson. Puerto Rican producer Echo produced, mixed and recorded the song, while Puerto Rican Grammy Award-winner musician Ángel "Cucco" Peña served as musical director. The song garnered the PRSO a nomination for a Latin Grammy Award for Best Urban Fusion/Performance at the 19th Latin Grammy Awards.

From August through May, the orchestra has weekly concerts at the Pablo Casals Symphony Hall.

Current music director is Maximiano Valdés.

Accolades
Latin Grammy Awards

See also

Orchestra
List of symphony orchestras in the United States
Classical music
Music of Puerto Rico
Conservatory of Music of Puerto Rico

References

American orchestras
Puerto Rican musical groups
Government-owned corporations of Puerto Rico
Wikipedia requested audio of orchestras
Performing arts in Puerto Rico